Hydrodendron is a genus of cnidarians belonging to the monotypic family Phylactothecidae.

The species of this genus are found in all oceans.

Species

Species:

Hydrodendron alternatum 
Hydrodendron arboreum

References

Phylactothecidae
Hydrozoan genera